Poe crater is a crater on Mercury. It has diameter about 75 km and is situated in northern part of Caloris Planitia. It is centered on

History
Poe crater is named after the famous author Edgar Allan Poe. NASA named this crater in 2011 in honor of the Poe Toaster who put a bottle of cognac and roses at the grave of Poe. When the Poe Toaster ceased their activities in 2011 NASA named the crater after Poe to remember them.

Links
 A Toast to Dear Old Poe

References

Poe Toaster

Impact craters on Mercury
Edgar Allan Poe